Siquijor's at-large congressional district is the provincewide electoral district in Siquijor, Philippines. The province has been represented in the country's national legislatures since 1984. It first elected a representative at-large during the 1984 Philippine parliamentary election following the restoration of provincial and city district representation in the Batasang Pambansa where Siquijor had previously been included in the regionwide representation of Central Visayas (Region VII) for the interim parliament. The province, created by the 1971 separation of Siquijor Island from Negros Oriental, was formerly represented as part of that province's 2nd district in earlier legislatures. Since the 1987 restoration of Congress following the ratification of a new constitution, Siquijor has been entitled to one member in the House of Representatives. It is currently represented in the 18th Congress by Jake Vincent S. Villa of the Nationalist People's Coalition (NPC).

Representation history

Election results

2019

2016

2013

2010

See also
Legislative districts of Siquijor

References

Congressional districts of the Philippines
Politics of Siquijor
1984 establishments in the Philippines
At-large congressional districts of the Philippines
Congressional districts of Central Visayas
Constituencies established in 1984